A Debian Pure Blend is a project completely inside of Debian targeting a server or a desktop installation in very broad and general terms.

A Debian Pure Blend aims to cover interests of specialised users, who might be children, lawyers, medical staff, visually impaired people, certain academic fields, etc. The common goal of those is to make installation and administration of computers for their target users as easy as possible, and to serve in the role as the missing link between software developers and users well.

Idea 
The ideas behind Debian Pure Blends are
 providing an out-of-the-box working solution (i.e. some useful collection of software from the Debian pool for the designated target group of specialists) for end-users
 providing a frame in which specialists can better channelize their efforts of sustaining a software ecosystem for their field

The Debian 8 "Jessie" release consists of approximately 43,000 software packages. Therefore, without knowing the specific name of a given application, it can be difficult for a user to find packages matching their needs. This is particularly an issue when the name of the software doesn't make its function clear.

Technical 
Linux distribution that is configured to support a particular target group out-of-the-box. All changes and improvements are integrated to the official Debian repositories. A Debian Pure Blend can contain multiple flavors (or profiles) (e.g., Debian Edu has flavors for main-server, workstation, and thin-client-server).

Technically a Debian Pure Blend builds a set of metapackages and provides an overview about the packages which are included and which are on the todo list for further inclusion. Both pages are rendered from the information inside the tasks files in an SVN.

Most of the distributions based on Debian, like for example Knoppix or Sacix, are not Debian Pure Blends, and Ubuntu is not even binary compatible with Debian. Linux Mint Debian Edition is binary compatible with Debian, but is also not a Debian Pure Blend.

Existing Debian Pure Blends 
 Debian Junior: Debian for children "from 1 to 99"
 Debian-Med: Debian in Health Care
 Debian Edu: Debian for Education
 Debian GIS: Debian with many geographic information system-Packages, e.g. GRASS GIS, QGIS, GPSPrune, QLandkarteGT, et al.
 Debian Astro: Debian for professional and amateur astronomers
 DebiChem: Debian for chemists
 Hamradio: Debian for radio amateurs
 Debian Accessibility
 Debian Science
 Debian Accessibility Project
 FreedomBox

Debian-Med
The Debian Med project  is a Debian Pure Blend created to provide a co-ordinated operating system and collection of available free software packages that are well-suited for the requirements for medical practices and medical research. Debian Med does not create or program software, but integrates software available under a license conforming to the DFSG into Debian and also extends Debian to be a better platform for this field of interest. The Debian Software Repositories contain over 51,000 packages. Debian Med serves as a magnifying lens to categorize all those packages, that as suited for the field of medicine.

Categories
Debian includes over 51,000 packages, many of those being the focus of Debian Med. These are being summarized into categories called tasks:

 Medical practice and Patient management
 Molecular Biology and Medical Genetics
 Medical imaging
 Drug databases
 Psychology
 and several others

See also 
 Fedora Robotics
 Robotics suite
 For medical records:
 Electronic health record
 Health informatics
 Fastra II
 Ubuntu-Med

References

External links
Detailed paper about Debian Pure Blends
Debian Wiki Blends article
Blends mailing list
Debian-med
 Debian Med talks
 Wiki page with further information for users and developers.

Debian-based distributions
Linux distributions